Packera bernardina is a rare species of flowering plant in the aster family known by the common name San Bernardino ragwort.

Distribution
The perennial herb is endemic to the San Bernardino Mountains of southern California, where it is known from about twenty occurrences.

It grows in mountain pine forests and the unique pebble plain habitat type of the local region.

Description
Packera bernardina is a perennial herb growing 30 to 50 centimeters in maximum height from a branching caudex and a rosette of basal leaves; several rosettes, each with a stem, may be clustered together. The spatula-shaped leaves have small squared oval blades with toothed edges which are borne on the ends of long petioles. Smaller, simpler leaves occur farther up the stem. The leaves are coated in a very short layer of woolly hairs.

The inflorescence contains several flower heads, each lined with hairy green phyllaries. The head contains many golden yellow disc florets and generally either 8 or 13 yellow ray florets each up to a centimeter long. The fruit is an achene with a body about a millimeter long tipped with a pappus of 3 or 4 millimeters.  The bloom period is May to July.

References

External links
 Calflora Database: Packera bernardina (San Bernardino ragwort)
Jepson Manual Treatment — Packera bernardina
USDA Plants Profile
Flora of North America
U.C. CalPhotos gallery of Packera bernardina

bernardina
Endemic flora of California
Natural history of the Transverse Ranges
~
Natural history of San Bernardino County, California
Taxa named by Edward Lee Greene